Phuphanochloa is a genus of flowering plants belonging to the family Poaceae.

Its native range is Thailand.

Species
Species:
 Phuphanochloa speciosa Sungkaew & Teerawat.

References

Bambusoideae
Bambusoideae genera